Ghosts of Rome is a 1961 Italian comedy film directed by Antonio Pietrangeli. It was released in the UK in 1964 as The Phantom Lovers.

Plot
Count di Roviano refuses to sell his palace to a developer, despite having no money. He lives with ghosts: Ronaldo, a lady's man, Bartholomew, a friar, Flora, who died with love, and a five year old boy.

The Count is blown up by his water heater and joins the ghosts. His nephew Federico inherits the castle and moves in with his girlfriend Eileen, intending to sell it. The ghosts call in an artist friend, Caparra, and try to get him to finish a painting so the castle is declared a national monument.

Cast
 Marcello Mastroianni - Reginaldo / Federico di Roviano / Gino
 Vittorio Gassman - Caparra, pittore del '600, rivale del Caravaggio
 Belinda Lee - Eileen
 Sandra Milo - Donna Flora
 Eduardo De Filippo - Don Annibale, Principe di Roviano
 Claudio Gora - Ing. Telladi
 Tino Buazzelli - Father Bartolomeo
 Franca Marzi - Nella
 Ida Galli - Carla
 Lilla Brignone - Regina
 Claudio Catania - Poldino
 Michele Riccardini - Antonio, tailor and doorman
 Enzo Cerusico - Admirer
 Nadia Marlowa
 Luciana Gilli - Girl in the park (as Gloria Gilli)
 Enzo Maggio - Fricandò
 Graziella Galvani - Mathematics teacher

Production
Nino Rota did the music. A writer on Rota's career analysed the score, saying that:
The music for the credits... is supplied first by a sprightly modern jazz combo, then by a barrel organ. This is appropriate for a film that is about the present and the past in two ways: ghosts occupying a palazzo in present-day Rome, and the destructive attempts of its new owners to modernise it, attempts thwarted by the ghosts. However, the ghosts’ motifs are not always played on old instruments; while on their first appearance in the film, each one’s motif is so introduced... this often gives way to jazziness... This play with motifs and instrumentations continues throughout the film and is appropriate: the ghosts are not anti-modern; they enjoy playing about in modern-day Rome while also wishing to preserve the inheritance of (their) past.

Reception
Variety said "pic is quaint but bogs down after some inventive early passages... special effects are good but without the film pacing to make them captivating throughout. Obvious phantoms soon get repetitive."

One review called it "a jolly little Roman fantasy." The Spectator called it "a cheerful surprise."

The Monthly Film Bulletin called it an "inoffensive comedy has a theme too slight and too lacking to be anything other than tedious when treated at such length."

Sight and Sound called it "a fragile fantasy". Filmink called it "entertaining".

Awards
Eduardo De Filippo won Best Supporting Actor at the 1961 San Francisco Film Festival.

References

External links

Film page at BFI

1961 films
1961 comedy films
Italian comedy films
1960s Italian-language films
Films scored by Nino Rota
Films directed by Antonio Pietrangeli
Films set in Rome
Films with screenplays by Ruggero Maccari
1960s Italian films